Jenő Jandó (born 1 February 1952) is a Hungarian pianist and Professor of the Franz Liszt Academy of Music in Budapest, Hungary.

Background and education
Jandó studied piano at the Liszt Academy with Katalin Nemes and Pál Kadosa, later going on to win many major international piano competitions, including the Georges Cziffra and Ciani Piano Competitions. However, his professional career began when he took third prize at the Beethoven Piano Competition at the age of 18. He was also the winner of the 1973 Hungarian Piano Concours and took first prize in the chamber music category at the Sydney International Piano Competition in 1977.

Solo and collaborative pianist
Jandó enjoys being both a solo and collaborative artist, as shown by his recordings, ranging from a complete recording of the Beethoven sonatas to Schubert's 'Trout' Quintet and Beethoven's 'Ghost' and 'Archduke' piano trios.

As a collaborative pianist, Jenő Jandó has worked with Takako Nishizaki in recordings of the Beethoven, Franck, Grieg violin sonatas, the complete Schubert sonatas, and the Mozart sonatas for Naxos Records, some of which are highly ranked by The Penguin Guide to Recorded Classical Music. His style of collaborating also shows itself in Kodály's Cello Sonata (Op. 4), as well as in a more recent recording of Dohnányi cello sonatas, in partnership with Maria Kliegel.

He is known for singing while playing, and to stop this, he puts an unlit cigarette in his mouth.

Composers
Jandó has recorded over 60 albums including music by Bach, Beethoven, Liszt, Schumann, Schubert, Brahms, Haydn, Bartók, Chopin and many other composers. He currently records exclusively for Naxos Records.

References

External links
Jenő Jandó biography and discography at Naxos.com

1952 births
Living people
Hungarian classical pianists
Hungarian male musicians
Male classical pianists
Academic staff of the Franz Liszt Academy of Music
Piano pedagogues
Classical accompanists
People from Pécs
Sydney International Piano Competition prize-winners
Franz Liszt Academy of Music alumni
Naxos Records artists
Jewish classical pianists